RBM is a three-letter acronym. It refers to:
89.1 Radio Blue Mountains, Radio station in Katoomba, New South Wales
The Roll Back Malaria (RBM) Partnership, the global framework to implement coordinated action against malaria.
Restricted Boltzmann machine, a type of neural network used in artificial intelligence applications
Rust Belt Music, a San Franciscan band
Rani Bilashmoni Govt. Boys' High School
Réseau des Bains de Mer a group of metre gauge railways centred on Noyelles-sur-Mer in France
Racing Bart Mampaey, a racing team competing in the World Touring Car Championship, running the BMW Team RBM operation
Richards Bay Minerals, a South African mining company
Reflected Brownian motion, a class of stochastic process
Raving Badger Music, YouTube Music Promotion Channel
Rating and Billing Manager, Business support system (billing) solution
Results-based management (RBM) is a management strategy which uses feedback loops to achieve strategic goals.
Straubing Wallmühle Airport in Germany
 Receptor binding motif in virology